Gol Gol-e Olya (also Romanized as Gol Gol-e ‘Olyā and Golgol-e ‘Olyā; also known as Gol Gol) is a village in Gachi Rural District, Gachi District, Malekshahi County, Ilam Province, Iran. At the 2006 census, its population was 162, in 25 families. The village is populated by Kurds.

References 

Populated places in Malekshahi County
Kurdish settlements in Ilam Province